Håvard Jørgensen (born 26 September 1975), also known as Haavard, Lemarchand, is a songwriter, guitarist and vocalist. He was the original guitarist of the Norwegian black metal bands Satyricon and Ulver.

Career

Satyricon
One of the initiators of the band Eczema (which later on became Satyricon) which started up in 1991. Eczema won (as the first death metal-act) the Oslo Championship of Rock in 1992 – and changed thereafter the name to Satyricon. Jørgensen participated on the first demo The Forest Is My Throne, but quit the band to join the newly founded Ulver in 1993.

Ulver
Jørgensen was with Ulver from 1993 to 2000, and later as a session-guitarist.

Snøhvitt
Vocalist, guitarist and songwriter in Snøhvitt

Discography

Satyricon
 Satyricon (demo, 1992)

Ulver
 Rehearsal 1993 (demo, 1993)
 Vargnatt (demo, 1993) – acoustic guitar
 Bergtatt – Et Eeventyr i 5 Capitler (1994) – guitar
 Kveldssanger (1995) – acoustic guitar, producer
 Nattens Madrigal – Aatte Hymne Til Ulven I Manden (1996) – guitar
 The Trilogie – Three Journeyes Through the Norwegian Netherworlde (box set, 1997) – guitar
 Themes from William Blake's The Marriage of Heaven and Hell (1998) – electric guitar
 Metamorphosis (EP, 1999) – electronic programming
 Perdition City (2000) – electric guitar
 Blood Inside (2005) – guitar on Dressed in Black, For the Love of God and Your Call
 Gods of Thunder: A Norwegian Tribute to Kiss (compilation, 2005) – Strange Ways
 Trolsk Sortmetall 1993-1997 (box set, 2014) – guitar, keyboards
 Sannhet på boks - En hyllest til Raga Rockers by various artists (compilation, 2015) – Trist At Det Skulle Ende Slik
 The Assassination of Julius Caesar (2017) – guitar on 1969

The Mindtrip Project
 Fragmentation (EP, 2000) – Departure and Content Zero

SCN
 Inside Out (2001) – guitar on All Tied Up and So Free

Head Control System
 Murder Nature (2006) – lead guitar on Masterpiece (of Art) and Rapid Eye Movement

References

Sources
Ulvers medlemmer

Norwegian songwriters
Norwegian composers
Norwegian male composers
Musicians from Oslo
Norwegian guitarists
Norwegian male guitarists
English-language singers from Norway
Norwegian male singers
Norwegian rock singers
Norwegian black metal musicians
Norwegian heavy metal musicians
Satyricon (band) members
Living people
Norwegian heavy metal guitarists
Black metal singers
1975 births
Ulver members